Innisfails GAA is a Gaelic Athletic Association club in based in Balgriffin, Fingal.

The club fields teams at adult men's football level and has a free nursery for children aged 4–7 years of age along with an under 8s & 9s team.

During the COVID-19 pandemic in the Republic of Ireland, the Irish Independent published photographs of a coach-led group of Dublin county football team members, including All Stars Footballer of the Year Brian Fenton, whom it reported had gathered at Innisfails GAA club before 7am on the previous morning. The session occurred around 12 hours after the GAA sent a note to each club and county, warning that any club or county team ignoring the collective training ban could risk putting the GAA's intentions to return to action "in serious jeopardy". That evening, after investigating the accuracy of the report, Dublin GAA suspended its own football team manager Dessie Farrell for 12 weeks with immediate effect. The incident provoked much public commentary from politicians and sportspeople.

Honours
 Dublin Junior Football Championship; 1937, 1943, 1973, 2001
 Dublin Intermediate Football Championship: 1984

References

Gaelic games clubs in Fingal
Gaelic football clubs in Fingal